Many English country houses have experienced a change of use and are no longer privately occupied.

Country houses converted to apartments
 Escowbeck
 Finedon Hall
 Hazelwood Hall
 Runshaw Hall
 Thurland Castle
 Woodfold Hall

Country houses converted to luxury hotels
 Cliveden
 Coworth House
 The Grove, Watford
 Hartwell House
 Peckforton Castle
 Shaw Hill
 Taymouth Castle
 Thurnham Hall
 Wyresdale Hall

Country houses used as schools or for other educational purposes
 Alston Hall
 Ashridge House
 Bramshill House
 Culford Park
 Dartington Hall
 Harlaxton Manor
 Heslington Hall
 Hinchingbrooke House
 Rossall Hall
 Prior Park
 Scarisbrick Hall
 Stowe House
 Townhill Park House
 Tring Park Mansion 
 Westonbirt House
 Wennington Hall

Country houses used for religious purposes
 Capernwray Hall
 Taplow Court

Country houses used as hospitals or residential care homes
 Cuernden Hall
 Gisburne Hall, private hospital
Leckhampton Court
 Littledale Hall
 Wrightington Hall, NHS hospital

Country houses run as museums or art galleries
 Astley Hall, museum and art gallery
 Compton Verney, art gallery
 Cusworth Hall, The museum of South Yorkshire Life
 Duff House, outstation of the National Gallery of Scotland
 Lytham Hall, run by English Heritage
 Paxton House, outstations of the National Gallery of Scotland
 Samlesbury Hall, run by trust
 Saint Fagans Castle, National Museum of History 
 Temple Newsam House, a museum of the decorative arts
 Towneley Park, museum and art gallery
 Turton Tower, run by Blackburn Council
 Wollaton Hall, natural history museum.

Country houses used for other purposes
 Alton Towers, amusement park.
 Drayton Manor, Drayton Manor Theme Park amusement park
 Donington Hall, office
 Hewell Grange, open prison
 Heskin Hall, antiques centre
 Waddow Hall, Girlguiding centre
 Winmarleigh Hall, children's activity centre
 Wyresdale Park, barn wedding venue and business centre

Other uses
The National Portrait Gallery (London) has several outstations at country houses: Montacute House is partially used to display Elizabethan and Jacobean portraits; Beningbrough Hall is used to display 18th-century portraits and Bodrhyddan Hall displays 19th-century portraits.

Knebworth House stages rock concerts in the park. Glyndebourne has an opera house attached. Port Lympne is now a zoo, several houses also have Safari parks in the grounds: Knowsley Hall (The house has never been open to the public), Longleat & Woburn Abbey. Clouds House is used as a centre for treating alcoholics and drug addicts. Moor Park is a golf club-house. Halton House is used by the Royal Air Force and Minley Manor was used by the army. Another common use of country houses is to convert them for multiple occupation, for example New Wardour Castle, Sheffield Park House & Stoneleigh Abbey whose former park Stoneleigh Park is used for exhibitions and agricultural shows. Culzean Castle, Margam Castle & Tatton Hall are at the centre of country parks. Goodwood House is a centre of both horse & motor racing. Ince Blundell Hall is now a nunnery. Toddington Manor is being convert into an art gallery and home by Damien Hirst. Many houses are now in the ownership of Local government and operated as country house museums including Ashton Court, Aston Hall being the first to be so owned from 1864, Cardiff Castle, Heaton Hall & Tredegar House. Ditchley is owned and used for conferences by the Ditchley Foundation.

See also

References